Princess Edward of Saxe-Weimar ( Lady Augusta Katherine Gordon-Lennox; 14 January 1827 – 3 April 1904) was a British aristocrat whose marriage to Prince Edward of Saxe-Weimar made her a kinswoman of the British Royal Family and a member of the royal family.

Lady Augusta Katherine Gordon-Lennox was born on 14 January 1827 at Goodwood House to Charles Gordon-Lennox, 5th Duke of Richmond (1791–1860) and his wife Lady Caroline Paget (1796–1874), daughter of Henry Paget, 1st Marquess of Anglesey. She descends in the male line from Charles Lennox, 1st Duke of Richmond, illegitimate son of King Charles II of England by his mistress Louise de Kérouaille.

On 27 November 1851, Lady Augusta Katherine married, morganatically, Prince Edward of Saxe-Weimar (1823–1902) at London. He was a son of Prince Bernhard of Saxe-Weimar-Eisenach and his wife Princess Ida of Saxe-Meiningen, the sister of Adelaide, queen consort of King William IV of the United Kingdom. Lady Augusta Katherine Gordon-Lennox was created Gräfin von Dornburg (Countess of Dornburg) by the uncle of her future husband Charles Frederick, Grand Duke of Saxe-Weimar-Eisenach the day before the wedding. They had no children.

In 1885, Queen Victoria granted her permission to share her husband's princely title. Henceforth she was known as Her Serene Highness Princess Edward of Saxe-Weimar, albeit only in Great Britain, while in Germany she remained only Countess of Dornburg. Her husband died on 16 November 1902 and she died on 3 April 1904 aged 77 in London.

Titles
14 January 1827 - 26 November 1851: Lady Augusta Katherine Gordon-Lennox
26 November 1851 - 1885: Augusta Katherine, Countess of Dornburg 
1885 - 3 April 1904: Her Serene Highness Princess Edward of Saxe-Weimar

References

1827 births
1904 deaths
Daughters of British dukes
Wives of knights
Morganatic spouses of German royalty
Augusta
Augusta